The Living Legend designation from the American Academy of Nursing is bestowed upon a very small number of nurses "in recognition of the multiple contributions these individuals have made to our profession and our society and in recognition of the continuing impact of these contributions on the provision of health care services in the United States and throughout the world." Each Living Legend has been a Fellow of the American Academy of Nursing (FAAN) for at least 15 years.

While over 2,000 nurses have achieved the FAAN designation, only a few dozen have been named Living Legends.

Living Legends

References

Living Legends of the American Academy of Nursing
Organizations based in Washington, D.C.